is a Japanese badminton player. He was selected to join the national team in 2013 and retired in 2021. Kamura was part of the national team that won the 2014 Thomas Cup. He captured his first Superseries title at the 2016 Hong Kong Open, and reached a career high of world number 2 in the men's doubles partnered with Keigo Sonoda in January 2017.

Kamura won the silver medal at the 2018 World Championships and a bronze in 2017. In the continental level, he helped the national team to win the 2017 Asia Mixed Team Championships, and he also collected a silver and three bronze medals in the individual men's doubles event. He competed at the 2014 and 2018 Asian Games.

Career 
Kamura competed at the 2020 Summer Olympics. Partnered with Keigo Sonoda, the duo was eliminated in the quarter-finals by the second seeds Mohammad Ahsan and Hendra Setiawan.

Achievements

BWF World Championships 
Men's doubles

Asian Championships 
Men's doubles

BWF World Tour (3 titles, 8 runners-up) 
The BWF World Tour, which was announced on 19 March 2017 and implemented in 2018, is a series of elite badminton tournaments sanctioned by the Badminton World Federation (BWF). The BWF World Tour is divided into levels of World Tour Finals, Super 1000, Super 750, Super 500, Super 300 (part of the HSBC World Tour), and the BWF Tour Super 100.

Men's doubles

BWF Superseries (2 titles, 2 runners-up) 
The BWF Superseries, which was launched on 14 December 2006 and implemented in 2007, was a series of elite badminton tournaments, sanctioned by the Badminton World Federation (BWF). BWF Superseries levels were Superseries and Superseries Premier. A season of Superseries consisted of twelve tournaments around the world that had been introduced since 2011. Successful players were invited to the Superseries Finals, which were held at the end of each year.

Men's doubles

  Superseries Finals Tournament
  Superseries Premier Tournament
  Superseries Tournament

BWF Grand Prix (3 titles, 1 runner-up) 
The BWF Grand Prix had two levels, the Grand Prix and Grand Prix Gold. It was a series of badminton tournaments sanctioned by the Badminton World Federation (BWF) and played between 2007 and 2017.

Men's doubles

Mixed doubles

  BWF Grand Prix Gold tournament
  BWF Grand Prix tournament

BWF International Challenge/Series (5 titles, 3 runners-up) 
Men's doubles

Mixed doubles

  BWF International Challenge tournament
  BWF International Series tournament

References

External links 
 

1990 births
Living people
Sportspeople from Saga Prefecture
Japanese male badminton players
Badminton players at the 2020 Summer Olympics
Olympic badminton players of Japan
Badminton players at the 2014 Asian Games
Badminton players at the 2018 Asian Games
Asian Games bronze medalists for Japan
Asian Games medalists in badminton
Medalists at the 2018 Asian Games
21st-century Japanese people